Mark Harris is a jazz double bassist, vocalist and composer from Sydney, Australia. Co-creator and member of children's band Lah-Lah, featured on a TV show of the same name originally broadcast on channel Nick Jr. and more recently on ABC Kids. Tina Harris, his wife, has the title role of 'Lah-Lah' while Harris is 'Buzz the Bandleader', who plays 'Lola the Dancing Double Bass'.

Harris is a member of ARIA Music Awards winning, gypsy fusion band Monsieur Camembert. 
He also is a member of Baby et Lulu and The Tango Saloon.

References

Living people
Australian jazz double-bassists
Male double-bassists
Australian jazz singers
Australian jazz composers
Male jazz composers
Musicians from Sydney
21st-century double-bassists
21st-century Australian male musicians
Australian children's musicians
1975 births
Australian male composers
21st-century Australian musicians
20th-century double-bassists
20th-century Australian musicians
20th-century Australian male musicians
20th-century jazz composers